S. E. Jacques Viot (25 August 1921 – 4 July 2012) was a French academic and diplomat.

The son of Edmond Viot, a civil servant, he was educated at Lycée Louis-le-Grand before attending ENS Paris.

Formerly a lecturer at the University of Dublin and a professor of ENA in Paris, he served as French Ambassador to the United Kingdom from 1984 until 1986, before being granted the title of Ambassadeur de France.

In 1950 he married Jeanne de Martimprey de Romécourt.

Honours 
  Commandeur, Légion d'honneur,
  Commandeur, Ordre national du Mérite

See also 
 List of Ambassadors of France to the United Kingdom

Notes

1921 births
2012 deaths
Academics of Trinity College Dublin
École nationale d'administration alumni
20th-century French diplomats
Ambassadors of France to Canada
Ambassadors of France to the United Kingdom
Commanders of the Ordre national du Mérite
Commandeurs of the Légion d'honneur
French expatriates in Ireland